The Shimon Peres Negev Nuclear Research Center (formerly the Negev Nuclear Research Center, unofficially sometimes referred to as the Dimona reactor) is an Israeli nuclear installation located in the Negev desert, about thirteen kilometers south-east of the city of Dimona. In August 2018, it was renamed after the late President and Prime Minister of Israel, and Nobel Peace Prize laureate, Shimon Peres.

Construction of the facility began in 1958 and its heavy-water nuclear reactor went active sometime between 1962 and 1964. Israel claims that the nuclear reactor and research facility is for research purposes into atomic science. However, the purpose of the reactor is believed to be the production of nuclear materials that may be used in Israel's nuclear weapons. Information about the facility remains highly classified and with respect to nuclear weapons, the country maintains a policy known as nuclear ambiguity—refusing either to confirm or deny their possession. Israel (with India, North Korea, Pakistan, and South Sudan) is one of five non-signatories to the Treaty on the Non-Proliferation of Nuclear Weapons, though it reportedly opened Dimona to U.S. inspection in January 1965, with inspections continuing until 1969. Israel is believed to have produced its first nuclear weapons by 1967, and it has been estimated to possess anywhere between 80 and 400 nuclear weapons.

The airspace over the Dimona facility is closed to all aircraft, and the area around it is heavily guarded and fenced off. During the Six-Day War, an Israeli missile shot down an Israeli Air Force Dassault Ouragan fighter that inadvertently flew over Dimona.

History

Construction 
Construction commenced in 1958, with French assistance according to the Protocol of Sèvres agreements. The complex was constructed in secret, and outside the International Atomic Energy Agency inspection regime. To maintain secrecy, French customs officials were told that the largest of the reactor components, such as the reactor tank, were part of a desalination plant bound for Latin America. Estimates of the cost of construction vary; the only reliable figure is from Shimon Peres, who wrote in his 1995 memoir that he and David Ben-Gurion collected US$40 million, "half the price of a reactor ... [from] Israel's friends around the world."

The Dimona reactor became critical sometime between 1962 and 1964, and with the plutonium produced there, the Israel Defense Forces most likely had their first nuclear weapons ready before the Six-Day War.

In 2021, it was reported that based on satellite imagery, the complex was undergoing a major expansion. The new construction was estimated to have begun in late 2018 or early 2019.

Inspections 

When the United States intelligence community discovered the purpose of the site in the early 1960s, the U.S. government demanded that Israel agree to international inspections. Israel agreed, but on the condition that inspectors from the U.S., rather than the International Atomic Energy Agency, be used, and that Israel would receive advance notice of all inspections. According to declassified Johnson Administration documents, Israel opened Dimona to U.S. inspection in January 1965. Israel is one of five nations not to have signed the NPT (others are India and Pakistan, both of which have acknowledged having nuclear weapons), alongside North Korea which left the NPT. South Sudan is also a non-signatory.

Some claim that because Israel knew the schedule of the inspectors' visits, it was able to hide the clandestine manufacture of nuclear weapons, thereby deceiving the inspectors, by installing temporary false walls and other devices before each inspection. The inspectors eventually informed the U.S. government that their inspections were useless, due to Israeli restrictions on what areas of the facility they could inspect. By 1969 the U.S. believed that Israel might have a nuclear weapon, and terminated inspections that year.

Jet aircraft take-down 
The Dimona reactor was overflown by unidentified jet aircraft before the Six-Day War in 1967. These planes were thought at the time to be Egyptian Air Force MiG-21s, although a controversial 2007 book argues that they were actually Soviet MiG-25s. During the war an Israeli fighter jet, damaged in a bombing raid over Jordan, was shot down by air defenses protecting the reactor after straying over it, killing the pilot, Captain Yoram Harpaz.

Nuclear weapons production 

The full-scale production of nuclear warheads is believed to have commenced by 1966, with the Israel Defense Forces believed to be in possession of up to 13 operational nuclear warheads by 1967.

Mordechai Vanunu revelations 

In 1986, Mordechai Vanunu, a former technician at Dimona, fled to the United Kingdom and revealed to the media some evidence of Israel's nuclear program and explained the purposes of each building, also revealing a top-secret underground facility directly below the installation. The Mossad, Israel's secret service, sent a female agent named Cheryl Bentov (née Hanin) who lured Vanunu to Italy, where he was arrested by Mossad agents and smuggled to Israel aboard a freighter. An Israeli court then tried him in secret on charges of treason and espionage, and sentenced him to eighteen years imprisonment. At the time of Vanunu's arrest, The Times reported that Israel had material for approximately 20 hydrogen bombs and 200 fission bombs by 1986. In the spring of 2004, Vanunu was released from prison, and placed under several strict restrictions, such as the denial of a passport, freedom of movement limitations and restrictions on communications with the press. Since his release, he has been rearrested and charged multiple times for violations of the terms of his release.

Safety concerns 
Safety concerns about the 55+ year-old reactor have been reported. In 2004, as a preventive measure, Israeli authorities distributed potassium iodide tablets to thousands of residents living nearby, in case of a release of radioactive iodine-131.

In 2006 a group of local residents was formed due to concerns regarding serious threats to health and safety from living near the reactor.

Attacks 
In January 2012, media reports indicated that the Israel Atomic Energy Commission had decided to temporarily shut down the reactor. The site's vulnerability to attack from Iran was cited as the main reason for the decision. In October and November 2012, it was reported that Hamas had fired rockets at Dimona and/or Negev Nuclear Research Center. In July 2014 Hamas again fired rockets towards the area surrounding the reactor. The facility was not harmed or damaged in any of the attempted strikes. In April 2021 a Syrian surface-to-air missile landed in the vicinity of the place.

Declassified documents 
In April 2016  the U.S. National Security Archive declassified dozens of documents from 1960 to 1970, which detail what American intelligence viewed as Israel's attempts to obfuscate the purpose and details of its nuclear program. The Americans involved in discussions with Prime Minister David Ben-Gurion and other Israelis believed the country was providing "untruthful cover" about intentions to build nuclear weapons.

Conspiracy theories

Assassination of John F. Kennedy 
In 2004, Mordechai Vanunu stated that the assassination of John F. Kennedy was Israel's response to "pressure [Kennedy] exerted on...Ben-Gurion, to shed light on Dimona's nuclear reactor in Israel". The Libyan leader Muammar Gaddafi claimed during a United Nations General Assembly speech in 2009 that Israel had ordered the killing of President Kennedy because Kennedy had wanted to investigate the Negev Nuclear Plant.

See also 
 IAEA safeguards
 Israel and weapons of mass destruction
 Nuclear weapons and Israel
 Nuclear proliferation
 Soreq Nuclear Research Center
 Dimona Radar Facility

References

Citations

Bibliography 

Books
 

 

 

Journals
 

 

News
 

 

 

 

 

 

 

 

 

 

 

 

 

 

 

 

 

Online sources

External links 
 US Army essay about Israel's nuclear weapons
 The Avner Cohen Collection, A collection of primary sources and interviews at the Nuclear Proliferation International History Project
 FAS's page about the Israeli nuclear program
 History of Israeli Nuclear Program
 Israel Special Weapons Guide
 Independent Thinktank Analysis of Israeli Nuclear Doctrine
 Animated video of the Dimona facility
 Armageddon — about Dimona written by Israelis
 Annotated bibliography for the Dimona nuclear complex from the Alsos Digital Library for Nuclear Issues 

France–Israel relations
Israeli nuclear development
Military nuclear reactors
Nuclear research institutes
Research institutes in Israel
Shimon Peres